Neurostrota is a genus of moths in the family Gracillariidae.

Species
Neurostrota brunnea Landry, 2006
Neurostrota cupreella (Walsingham, 1897)
Neurostrota gunniella (Busck, 1906)
Neurostrota magnifica Landry, 2006
Neurostrota pithecolobiella Busck, [1934]

External links
Global Taxonomic Database of Gracillariidae (Lepidoptera)

Gracillariinae
Gracillarioidea genera